Siniša Avramovski (born September 2, 1983) is a Macedonian former professional basketball center who last played for Blokotehna.

References

External links
 basketball.eurobasket.com
 basketball.realgm.com
 proballers.com
 erlsport.com
 

1983 births
Living people
Macedonian men's basketball players
Sportspeople from Skopje
KK Rabotnički players
KK MZT Skopje players
OKK Beograd players
Apollon Limassol BC players
Centers (basketball)